Siahkal County is in Gilan province, Iran. The capital of the county is the city of Siahkal. At the 2006 census, the county's population was 46,991 in 13,196 households. The following census in 2011 counted 47,096 people in 14,933 households. At the 2016 census, the county's population was 46,975 in 16,351 households.

Administrative divisions

The population history of Siahkal County's administrative divisions over three consecutive censuses is shown in the following table. The latest census shows two districts, five rural districts, and two cities.

References

 

Counties of Gilan Province